Portmahomack ('Haven of My [i.e. 'Saint'] Colmóc') is a small fishing village in Easter Ross, Scotland. It is situated in the Tarbat Peninsula in the parish of Tarbat. There is evidence of early settlement, and the area seems to have been the site of significant activity during the time of the Picts, early Christianity and the Vikings. The village is situated on a sandy bay and has a small harbour designed by Thomas Telford: it shares with Hunstanton the unusual distinction of being on the east coast but facing west. Portmahomack lies inside the Moray Firth Special Area of Conservation  with the associated dolphin and whale watching activity.

The village has a primary school, golf course, hotel, a number of places to eat and a shop with a sub-post office. The nearest rail access is at Fearn railway station and the nearest commercial airport is at Inverness Airport. Tain also has rail access. The hamlet of Rockfield is nearby and is accessed via the village of Portmahomack.

History

The earliest evidence of habitation is provided by shell middens pointing to settlement as early as one or two thousand years BCE.

There are the remains of an Iron Age broch a little to the west of the village.  Finds of elaborate early Christian carved stones dating to the 8th-9th centuries (including one with an inscription), in and around the churchyard, had long suggested that Portmahomack was the site of an important early church in the sixth-seventh century.

Possible Roman camp

In 1822  Rev Grant, minister of Boharn, described "a beautiful square fortification of about 100 paces of a side" near Blàr a' Chath, north of the village. 
It was tentatively identified as a Roman camp in 1949 by O. G. S. Crawford although he did not visit the site and no trace was found of its existence during a later visit.

It had apparently been defaced by 1872 during land reclamation, but in Crawford's opinion there may be some traces of the Roman camp still visible or to be discovered.

It has been suggested that the supposed camp was visited by emperor Septimius Severus, based on remarks made by the Roman historian Cassius Dio: "Severus did not desist until he approached the extremity of the island".

Monastery 

Portmahomack is the site of the first confirmed Pictish monastery and the subject between 1994 and 2007 of one of the largest archaeological investigations in Scotland directed by Martin Carver (b. 1941).  The monastery began around 550 AD and was destroyed by fire in about 800 AD. It had a burial ground with cist and head-support burials, a stone church, at least four monumental stone crosses and workshops making church plate and early Christian books. The making of vellum in an early medieval site was detected for the first time here by Cecily Spall of FAS Ltd.

Over two hundred pieces of sculpture have been found, some of it broken up in a layer of burning suggesting that the monastic buildings were violently destroyed, possibly in a Viking raid, about the year 800.  The tradition of holiness survived sufficiently strongly to allow the site to become that of the later medieval parish church of St Colmóc.

The present restored building, adapted to house a museum after lying empty for a number of years, has been shown by archaeological investigation to be itself a monument of great interest, of multi-phase construction, the oldest part (the east wall of the crypt) having been built as early as the 9th century. The museum and visitor centre in St Colmóc's Church is managed by the Tarbat Historic Trust.

The precise identity of 'Colmóc' is uncertain.  The name is an 'affectionate' or hypocoristic form, and could refer either to one of the many early Irish holy men with the common name of Colmán (e.g. Colmán of Lindisfarne), or to St. Columba (Old Irish Colm Cille).

Recent research on the ancient trench around the local monastery found organic samples in the date range from 140 AD to 590 AD. The area enclosed by the ditch may have been a "settlement, craft-working centre and/or hub of a Pictish community", connected to the possible Roman fortification in Port a Chaistell.

Battle of Tarbat Ness
The Battle of Tarbat Ness was a land battle fought (c 1030-1040) between Thorfinn the Mighty, Earl (Jarl) of Caithness and the King of Scotland.

Middle Ages
In the Battle of Tarbat in the 1480s, a raiding party from the Clan Mackay of Strathnaver were cornered in the Tarbat church by the Clan Ross, who killed many of them before setting fire to the church.

Agricultural Improvement
The New Statistical Account of Scotland (1840) makes reference to new and improved agricultural practices being introduced from East Lothian.  The area benefited as a result and there are many newspaper accounts of grain shipments from Portmahomack to Leith and London during the 19th century.

White Fish Boom
Portmahomack was a centre for the white fishing boom that lasted up until the early part of the 20th century.  The bay was so full of boats at time that it was said you could walk from the harbour to the rocks on the other side of the bay without getting wet.

World War 2
The direct Fendom road to Tain was closed due to the construction of the airfield at RAF Tain. Parts of the area were evacuated for a period of months to allow landing exercises to be carried out in preparation for D Day in 1944. The Jiri Weiss directed propaganda film Before the Raid was filmed in Portmahomack in 1943.

Tourist site 
Today, Portmahomack is a tourist destination with its traditional harbour, swimming beach, golf, dolphin watching, fishing and other watersports.  It has a permanent population of between 500 and 600 residents.  In the former parish church the Tarbat Discovery Centre, designed by exhibition consultants Higgins Gardner & Partners, houses displays on local history, and many of the finds from several seasons of excavation within the church itself, and in the fields surrounding the churchyard. It also houses the Peter Fraser Archive of memorabilia relating to Peter Fraser, wartime prime minister of New Zealand, who was born and grew up in  Hill of Fearn,  distant from Portmahomack.

Notable among these are a large collection of fragments of Pictish stone sculpture, many of them superbly carved with figures of ecclesiastics, fantastic and realistic animals, 'Celtic' interlace and key-pattern, and other motifs. The large elaborate late seventeenth- or early eighteenth-century bell-turret on the west gable of the church is an unusual and distinctive feature.

Some important Pictish carved stones from Portmahomack are on display in the Museum of Scotland, Edinburgh with replicas in the Tarbat Discovery Centre.

Two other important historic buildings in Portmahomack are adjoining 'girnals' (storehouses), built in the late 17th century and 1779, overlooking the harbour (restored as housing).  The former is one of the oldest such buildings to survive in Scotland.  The village also features a number of attractive 18th/early 19th century houses lining the shore.

The harbour was improved by the famous engineer Thomas Telford and was important in grain export in the 19th century.

Portmahomack was a favourite holiday location for Lord Reith  (John Reith, 1st Baron Reith),  Director-General of the BBC,  who holidayed in the Blue House, still aptly painted blue and located on the seafront, near the harbour.

The murder-mystery writer Anne Perry lived adjacent to the village for a number of years.

John Shepherd-Barron, the inventor of the ATM (Auto-Teller Machine), lived in the nearby community of Geanies until his death in 2010.

Professor Thomas Summers West, was a famous son of the Village with an Exhibition held in his name at the Tarbat Discovery Centre in 2011

See also
 Battle of Tarbat
 Portmahomack sculpture fragments
 Tarbat Ness Lighthouse
 Ballone Castle

Gallery

Notes

References
 Carver M.O.H., 1999. Surviving in Symbols. A Visit to the Pictish Nation (Birlinn).
 Carver M.O.H., 2004. An Iona of the East: The Early-medieval Monastery at Portmahomack, Tarbat Ness in Medieval Archaeology 48 (2004): 1-30.
 Carver, M.O.H., 2006. "A Columban Monastery in Pictland" in Current Archaeology 205: 20-29.
 Campbell George F, 2006. The First and Lost Iona (attributing the name Portmahomack to St Cormac).
 Carver, Martin, 2008. Portmahomack: Monastery of the Picts (Edinburgh University Press).
 Carver, M., Garner-Lahire, J. and Spall, C., 2016. Portmahomack on Tarbat Ness: Changing Ideologies in North-east Scotland, Sixth to Sixteenth Century AD, Historic Scotland / FAS Heritage / University of York.

External links

 Portmahomack.org
 Tarbat Discovery Programme
 Portmahomack.net

Archaeological sites in Highland (council area)
Populated places in Ross and Cromarty
Iron Age sites in Scotland